The Oden class was a class of coastal defence ships of the Swedish Navy. The class comprised Oden, Niord and Thor.

Design

Dimensions and machinery

Armour

Armament
The main armament of the ships where two  single turret guns. Secondary armament included six single  guns and ten  single guns.

Construction
Oden was laid down in 1894 at the Bergsund At Finnboda shipyard and was launched in 1896. She was commissioned in 1898. 
Niord was laid down in 1900 at the Lindholmen At Goteborg shipyard and was launched in 1898. She was commissioned in 1899. 
Thor was laid down in 1896 also at the Bergsund At Finnboda shipyard and was launched in 1898. She was commissioned in 1899.

External links
Description of class

 
Coastal defense ship classes